Agvaansamdangiin Sükhbat (born June 30, 1971, "Axe firm") is the second most successful Mongolian wrestler of 21st century with three championship wins (2000, 2001, 2004) and first Mongolian wrestler to officially declare retirement in 2006.

His rank/title, showing respect within the wrestling world, is "Dayar dursagdah, dalai dayan, avraga Sükhbat" literally meaning "Renowned by all, oceanic, titan Sükhbat," essentially the highest rank possible in Mongolian wrestling.

He was also a two times winner (1995, 1997) in the Amateur Sumo World Championships.

External links
 https://web.archive.org/web/20110706084307/http://amateursumo.com/tourneys.htm

1971 births
Living people
People from Töv Province
Mongolian male sport wrestlers
20th-century Mongolian people
21st-century Mongolian people